"Eden" is the third single from Belgian group Hooverphonic's album Blue Wonder Power Milk released in 1998 (see 1998 in music). The album peaked at 12 on the Belgian singles chart, charting for 13 weeks. The song also appeared on the soundtrack of I Still Know What You Did Last Summer.

Track listing
 "Eden" (Single version)
 "Tuna"

Sarah Brightman version

Sarah Brightman covered the song from her album of the same name, Eden, released in 1998. It peaked at #68 on the UK Singles Chart. A music video for "Eden" was also filmed.

The song "He Moved Through the Fair" is exclusive to the CD single. The CD was available in both two-track and three-track varieties.

Track listing
 "Eden"
 "He Moved Through the Fair"
 "First of May"

References

1998 singles
Sarah Brightman songs
Hooverphonic songs
Songs written by Alex Callier
Song recordings produced by Frank Peterson
1998 songs
Columbia Records singles
1990s ballads